Quarrel may refer to:

 A heated disagreement
 Crossbow bolt, a crossbow's projectile also known as a quarrel
 Quarrel (James Bond), a James Bond character
 Quarrel Jr., his son
 Quarrel (video game)
 The Quarrel, 1991 Canadian film
 Loki's Quarrel, a poem of the Poetic Edda
 Quarrel, an alias used by two superhuman characters in the comic book series Astro City

See also
 
 
 Quarry (disambiguation)